Viaggio Air (VM) was a private airline based and registered in Sofia, Bulgaria in September 2002.

History 

It started operations with an ATR 42 aircraft on 27 February 2003. It firstly started operating flights to Vienna and Istanbul and had plans to operate to Kyiv and Athens. At a later stage it was 100% bought by Hemus Air (DU), which also acquired Bulgaria Air (FB).
In late 2007 Viaggio Air ceased flight operations.

Fleet 
The Viaggio Air fleet had the following aircraft (as of February 2008):

2 ATR 42-300

As of 3 June 2008, the average age of the Viaggio Air fleet is 19.1 years.

External links
Viaggio Air Fleet

References 

Defunct airlines of Bulgaria
Airlines established in 2002
Airlines disestablished in 2007
Bulgarian companies established in 2002
2007 disestablishments in Bulgaria